Meshelsheh or Mesheylshiyeh may refer to:
 Meshelsheh-ye Olya
 Meshelsheh-ye Sofla